Tomás Vilanova (18 January 1925 – July 2007) was a Salvadoran sports shooter. He competed in two events at the 1968 Summer Olympics.

References

External links
 

1925 births
2007 deaths
Salvadoran male sport shooters
Olympic shooters of El Salvador
Shooters at the 1968 Summer Olympics
Sportspeople from Santa Ana, El Salvador